This is a list of the Russian moth species of the superfamilies Zygaenoidea, Sesioidea, Cossoidea and Tortricoidea. It also acts as an index to the species articles and forms part of the full List of moths of Russia.

Zygaenoidea

Limacodidae
Apoda limacodes (Hufnagel, 1766)
Austrapoda dentata (Oberthur, 1879)
Ceratonema christophi (Graeser, 1888)
Chibiraga banghaasi (Herring & Happ, 1927)
Heterogenea asella ([Denis & Schiffermüller], 1775)
Kitanola sachalinensis Matsumura, 1925
Kitanola speciosa Inoue, 1956
Kitanola uncula (Staudinger, 1887)
Microleon longipalpis Butler, 1885
Monema flavescens Walker, 1855
Narosoideus flavidorsalis (Staudinger, 1887)
Narosoideus fuscicostalis (Fixsen, 1887)
Neothosea suigensis (Matsumura, 1931)
Parasa consocia Walker, 1863
Parasa hilarata (Staudinger, 1887)
Parasa sinica Moore, 1877
Phlossa conjuncta (Walker, 1855)
Phrixolepia sericea Butler, 1877
Pseudopsyche dembowskii Oberthur, 1879
Pseudopsyche endoxantha Pungeler, 1914

Zygaenidae
Adscita albanica (Naufock, 1926)
Adscita geryon (Hübner, [1813])
Adscita obscura (Zeller, 1847)
Adscita statices (Linnaeus, 1758)
Amuria cyclops Staudinger, 1887
Artona funeralis (Butler, 1879)
Artona gracilis (Walker, 1865)
Artona octomaculata (Bremer, 1861)
Elcysma westwoodii (Snellen van Vollenhoven, 1863)
Illiberis assimilis Jordan, 1907
Illiberis consimilis Leech, 1898
Illiberis cybele (Leech, 1889)
Illiberis hyalina (Staudinger, 1887)
Illiberis kardakoffi Alberti, 1951
Illiberis kuprijanovi Efetov, 1995
Illiberis pruni Dyar, 1905
Illiberis psychina (Oberthur, 1880)
Illiberis rotundana Jordan, 1907
Illiberis tenuis (Butler, 1877)
Illiberis ulmivora (Graeser, 1888)
Inope heterogyna Staudinger, 1887
Inope maerens (Staudinger, 1887)
Jordanita budensis (Ad. & Aug. Speyer, 1858)
Jordanita chloros (Hübner, [1813])
Jordanita globulariae (Hübner, 1793)
Jordanita graeca (Jordan, 1907)
Jordanita notata (Zeller, 1847)
Jordanita paupera (Christoph, 1887)
Jordanita subsolana (Staudinger, 1862)
Jordanita volgensis (Moschler, 1862)
Pryeria sinica Moore, 1877
Rhagades pruni ([Denis & Schiffermüller], 1775)
Theresimima ampellophaga (Bayle-Barelle, 1808)
Zygaena alpherakyi Sheljuzhko, 1936
Zygaena angelicae Ochsenheimer, 1808
Zygaena armena Eversmann, 1851
Zygaena brizae (Esper, 1800)
Zygaena carniolica (Scopoli, 1763)
Zygaena centaureae Fischer von Waldheim, 1832
Zygaena cynarae (Esper, 1789)
Zygaena dorycnii Ochsenheimer, 1808
Zygaena ephialtes (Linnaeus, 1767)
Zygaena exulans (Hohenwarth, 1792)
Zygaena filipendulae (Linnaeus, 1758)
Zygaena fraxini Menetries, 1832
Zygaena haberhaueri Lederer, 1870
Zygaena laeta (Ht1bner, 1790)
Zygaena lonicerae (Scheven, 1777)
Zygaena loti ([Denis & Schiffermüller], 1775)
Zygaena mana (Kirby, 1892)
Zygaena minos ([Denis & Schiffermüller], 1775)
Zygaena nevadensis Rambur, 1858
Zygaena niphona Butler, 1877
Zygaena osterodensis Reiss, 1921
Zygaena punctum Ochsenheimer, 1808
Zygaena purpuralis (Brunnich, 1763)
Zygaena sedi Fabricius, 1787
Zygaena viciae ([Denis & Schiffermüller], 1775)

Sesioidea

Brachodidae
Brachodes albina Zagulajev, 1999
Brachodes appendiculata (Esper, 1783)
Brachodes dispar (Herrich-Schäffer, 1854)
Brachodes fulgurita (Fischer von Waldheim, 1832)
Brachodes pumila (Ochsenheimer, 1808)
Brachodes pusilla (Eversmann, 1844)
Brachodes staudingeri Kallies, 1998
Brachodes straminella (Rebel, 1916)

Sesiidae
Bembecia bestianaeli (Capuse, 1973)
Bembecia daghestanica Gorbunov, 1991
Bembecia ichneumoniformis ([Denis & Schiffermüller], 1775)
Bembecia jakuta (Herz, 1903)
Bembecia megillaeformis (Hübner, [1813])
Bembecia puella Z.Lastuvka, 1989
Bembecia sareptana (Bartel, 1912)
Bembecia scopigera (Scopo1i, 1763)
Bembecia strandi (W.Kozhantschikov, 1936)
Bembecia volgensis Gorbunov, 1994
Chamaesphecia annellata (Zeller, 1847)
Chamaesphecia astatiformis (Herrich-Schäffer, 1846)
Chamaesphecia bibioniformis (Esper, 1800)
Chamaesphecia chalciformis (Esper, 1804)
Chamaesphecia colpiformis (Staudinger, 1856)
Chamaesphecia crassicornis Bartel, 1912
Chamaesphecia djakonovi Popescu-Gorj & Capuse, 1966
Chamaesphecia dumonti Le Cerf, 1922
Chamaesphecia empiformis (Esper, 1783)
Chamaesphecia euceraeformis (Ochsenheimer, 1816)
Chamaesphecia guriensis (Emich, 1872)
Chamaesphecia masariformis (Ochsenheimer, 1808)
Chamaesphecia oxybeliformis (Herrich-Schäffer, 1846)
Chamaesphecia palustris Kautz, 1927
Chamaesphecia schmidtiiformis (Freyer, 1836)
Chamaesphecia tenthrediniformis ([Denis & Schiffermüller], 1775)
Dipchasphecia altaica Gorbunov, 1991
Dipchasphecia rhodocnemis Gorbunov, 1991
Eusphecia pimplaeformis (Oberthur, 1872)
Microsphecia brosiformis (Hübner, [1813])
Milisipepsis takizawai (Arita & Spatenka, 1989)
Negotinthia cingulata (Staudinger, 1871)
Oligophlebia ulmi (Yang & Wang, 1989)
Paraglossecia micra Gorbunov, 1988
Paranthrene diaphana Dalla-Torre & Strand, 1925
Paranthrene tabaniformis (Rottemburg, 1775)
Paranthrenopsis editha (Butler, 1878)
Pennisetia hylaeiformis (Laspeyres, 1801)
Pennisetia pectinata (Staudinger, 1887)
Scalarignathia coreacola (Matsumura, 1931)
Scalarignathia kaszabi Capuse, 1973
Scalarignathia ussuriensis Gorbunov & Arita, 1995
Sesia apiformis (Clerck, 1759)
Sesia bembeciformis (Hübner, [1806])
Sesia melanocephala Dalman, 1816
Sesia yezoensis (Hampson, 1919)
Synansphecia cirgisa (Bartel, 1912)
Synansphecia muscaeformis (Esper, 1783)
Synansphecia triannuliformis (Freyer, 1845)
Synanthedon andrenaeformis (Laspeyres, 1801)
Synanthedon bicingulata (Staudinger, 1887)
Synanthedon cephiformis (Ochsenheimer, 1808)
Synanthedon cerskisi Gorbunov, 1994
Synanthedon conopiformis (Esper, 1782)
Synanthedon culiciformis (Linnaeus, 1758)
Synanthedon flaviventris (Staudinger, 1883)
Synanthedon formicaeformis (Esper, 1783)
Synanthedon herzi Spatenka & Gorbunov, 1992
Synanthedon martjanovi Sheljuzhko, 1918
Synanthedon mesiaeformis (Herrich-Schäffer, 1846)
Synanthedon multitarso Spatenka & Arita, 1992
Synanthedon myopaeformis (Borkhausen, 1789)
Synanthedon polaris (Staudinger, 1877)
Synanthedon pseudoscoliaeformis Spatenka & Arita, 1992
Synanthedon scoliaeformis (Borkhausen, 1789)
Synanthedon spheciformis ([Denis & Schiffermüller], 1775)
Synanthedon stomoxiformis (Hübner, 1790)
Synanthedon tenuis (Butler, 1878)
Synanthedon tipuliformis (Clerck, 1759)
Synanthedon ulmicola Yang & Wang, 1989
Synanthedon uralensis (Bartel, 1906)
Synanthedon velox (Fixsen, 1887)
Synanthedon vespiformis (Linnaeus, 1761)
Synanthedon yanoi Spatenka & Arita, 1992
Weismanniola agdistiformis (Staudinger, 1866)

Cossoidea

Cossidae
Acossus terebra ([Denis & Schiffermüller], 1775)
Acossus viktor (Yakovlev, 2004)
Catopta albonubila (Graeser, 1888)
Catopta perunovi Yakovlev, 2007
Cossus cossus (Linnaeus, 1758)
Cossus shmakovi Yakovlev, 2004
Cossus siniaevi Yakovlev, 2004
Deserticossus arenicola (Staudinger, 1879)
Deserticossus campicola (Eversmann, 1854)
Deserticossus consobrinus (Pungeler, 1898)
Deserticossus sareptensis (Rothschild, 1912)
Deserticossus tsingtauana (Bang-Haas, 1912)
Deserticossus volgensis (Christoph, 1893)
Dyspessa infuscata (Staudinger, 1892)
Dyspessa kostjuki Yakovlev, 2005
Dyspessa pallidata (Staudinger, 1892)
Dyspessa salicicola (Eversmann, 1848)
Dyspessa ulula (Borkhausen, 1790)
Eogystia sibirica (Alphéraky, 1895)
Kotchevnik durrellii Yakovlev, 2004
Meharia scythica D.Komarov & Zolotuhin, 2005
Paracossulus thrips (Hübner, 1818)
Parahypopta caestrum (Hübner, 1808)
Phragmataecia albida (Erschoff, 1874)
Phragmataecia castaneae (Hübner, 1790)
Phragmataecia pacifica Yakovlev, 2007
Phragmataecia pygmaea Graeser, 1888
Streltzoviella insularis (Staudinger, 1892 )
Stygioides colchica (Herrich-Schäffer, 1851)
Stygioides tricolor (Lederer, 1858)
Zeuzera multistrigata Moore, 1881
Zeuzera pyrina (Linnaeus, 1761)

Tortricoidea

Tortricidae
Abrepagoge treitschkeana (Treitschke, 1835)
Acleris abietana (Hübner, [1822])
Acleris affinatana (Snellen, 1883)
Acleris albiscapulana (Christoph, 1881)
Acleris alnivora Oku, 1956
Acleris amurensis Caradja, 1928
Acleris askoldana (Christoph, 1881)
Acleris aspersana (Hübner, [1817])
Acleris aurichalcana (Bremer, 1864)
Acleris bergmanniana (Linnaeus, 1758)
Acleris caerulescens Walsingham, 1900
Acleris comariana (Lienig & Zeller, 1846)
Acleris conchyloides (Walsingham, 1900)
Acleris crataegi (Kuznetzov, 1964)
Acleris cribellata Falkovitsh, 1965
Acleris cristana ([Denis & Schiffermüller], 1775)
Acleris dealbata (Yasuda, 1975)
Acleris delicatana (Christoph, 1881)
Acleris emargana (Fabricius, 1775)
Acleris enitescens (Meyrick, 1912)
Acleris expressa Filipjev, 1931
Acleris exsucana (Kennel, 1901)
Acleris ferrugana ([Denis & Schiffermüller], 1775)
Acleris filipjevi Obraztsov, 1956
Acleris fimbriana (Thunberg, 1791)
Acleris forsskaleana (Linnaeus, 1758)
Acleris fuscotogata Walsingham, 1900
Acleris gobica Kuznetzov, 1975
Acleris hastiana (Linnaeus, 1758)
Acleris hippophaeana (Heyden, 1865)
Acleris hispidana (Christoph, 1881)
Acleris holmiana (Linnaeus, 1758)
Acleris hyemana (Haworth, 1811)
Acleris idonea Razowski, 1972
Acleris implexana (Walker, 1863)
Acleris indignana (Christoph, 1881)
Acleris issikii Oku, 1957
Acleris kochiella (Goeze, 1783)
Acleris kuznetsovi Razowski, 1989
Acleris lacordairana (Duponchel, 1836)
Acleris laterana (Fabricius, 1794)
Acleris leechi (Walsingham, 1900)
Acleris lipsiana ([Denis & Schiffermüller], 1775)
Acleris literana (Linnaeus, 1758)
Acleris logiana (Clerck, 1759)
Acleris longipalpana (Snellen, 1883)
Acleris lorquiniana (Duponchel, 1835)
Acleris maccana (Treitschke, 1835)
Acleris napaea (Meyrick, 1912)
Acleris nigrilineana Kawabe, 1963
Acleris nigriradix Filipjev, 1931
Acleris notana (Donovan, 1806)
Acleris obtusana (Eversmann, 1844)
Acleris ochropicta Razowski, 1975
Acleris paradiseana Walsingham, 1900
Acleris perfundana Kuzuetzov, 1962
Acleris permutana (Duponchel, 1836)
Acleris phalera (Kuznetzov, 1964)
Acleris platynotana (Walsingham, 1900)
Acleris proximana Caradja, 1927
Acleris pulchella Kawabe, 1963
Acleris quercinana (Zeller, 1849)
Acleris rhombana ([Denis & Schiffermüller], 1775)
Acleris roscidana (Hübner, [1799])
Acleris rubivorella (Filipjev, 1962)
Acleris rufana ([Denis & Schiffermüller], 1775)
Acleris salicicola Kuznetzov, 1970
Acleris scabrana ([Denis & Schiffermüller], 1775)
Acleris schalleriana (Linnaeus, 1761)
Acleris shepherdana (Stephens, 1852)
Acleris similis Filipjev, 1931
Acleris sparsana ([Denis & Schiffermüller], 1775)
Acleris stibiana (Snellen, 1883)
Acleris strigifera Filipjev, 1931
Acleris submaccana (Filipjev, 1962)
Acleris tigricolor (Walsingham, 1900)
Acleris ulmicola (Meyrick, 1930)
Acleris umbrana (Hübner, [1799])
Acleris uniformis Filipjev, 1931
Acleris variegana ([Denis & Schiffermüller], 1775)
Adoxophyes orana (Fischer von Röslerstamm, 1834)
Aethes alatavica (Danilevsky, 1962)
Aethes amurensis Razowski, 1964
Aethes beatricella (Walsingham, 1898)
Aethes bilbaensis (Rossler, 1877)
Aethes caucasica (Amsel, 1959)
Aethes citreoflava Kumetzov, 1966
Aethes cnicana (Westwood, 1854)
Aethes confinis Razowski, 1974
Aethes decens Razowski, 1970
Aethes deutschiana (Zetterstedt, 1839)
Aethes dilucidana (Stephens, 1852)
Aethes fennicana (Hering, 1924)
Aethes flagellana (Duponchel, 1836)
Aethes flava Kumetzov, 1970
Aethes francillana (Fabricius, 1794)
Aethes hartmanniana (Clerck, 1759)
Aethes hoenei Razowski, 1964
Aethes kindermanniana (Treitschke, 1830)
Aethes languidana (Mann, 1855)
Aethes margaritana (Haworth, 1811)
Aethes margaritifera Falkovitsh, 1963
Aethes margarotana (Duponchel, 1836)
Aethes mesomelana (Walker, 1863)
Aethes moribundana (Staudinger, 1859)
Aethes nefandana (Kennel, 1899)
Aethes obscurana (Caradja, 1916)
Aethes piercei (Obraztsov, 1952)
Aethes prangana (Kennel, 1900)
Aethes rectilineana (Caradja, 1939)
Aethes rubigana (Treitschke, 1830)
Aethes rutilana (Hübner, [1817])
Aethes sanguinana (Treitschke, 1830)
Aethes scalana (Zerny, 1927)
Aethes smeathmanniana (Fabricius, 1781)
Aethes tesserana ([Denis & Schiffermüller], 1775)
Aethes tornella (Walsingham, 1898)
Aethes triangulana (Treitschke, 1835)
Aethes williana (Brahm, 1791)
Aethes xanthina Falkovitsh, 1963
Agapeta hamana (Linnaeus, 1758)
Agapeta zoegana (Linnaeus, 1767)
Aleimma loeflingiana (Linnaeus, 1758)
Amphicoecia adamana (Kennel, 1919)
Ancylis achatana ([Denis & Schiffermüller], 1775)
Ancylis amplimacula Falkovitsh, 1965
Ancylis angulifasciana Zel1er, 1875
Ancylis apicella ([Denis & Schiffermüller], 1775)
Ancylis badiana ([Denis & Schiffermüller], 1775)
Ancylis bucovinella Peiu & Nemes, 1969
Ancylis comptana (Frolich, 1828)
Ancylis corylicolana Kuznetzov, 1962
Ancylis diminutana (Haworth, 1811)
Ancylis geminana (Donovan, 1806)
Ancylis karafutonis Matsumura, 1911
Ancylis kenneli Kumetzov, 1962
Ancylis kurentzovi (Kuznetzov, 1969)
Ancylis laetana (Fabricius, 1775)
Ancylis loktini (Kuznetzov, 1969)
Ancylis mandarinana Walsingham, 1900
Ancylis melanostigma Kuznetzov, 1970
Ancylis minimana (Caradja, 1916)
Ancylis mitterbacheriana ([Denis & Schiffermüller], 1775)
Ancylis myrtiliana (Treitschke, 1830)
Ancylis nemorana (Kuznetzov, 1969)
Ancylis obtusana (Haworth, 1811)
Ancylis paludana (Barrett, 1871)
Ancylis partitana (Christoph, 1882)
Ancylis repandana Kennel, 1901
Ancylis selenana (Guenée, 1845)
Ancylis subacurana (Douglas, 1847)
Ancylis tineana (Hübner, [1799])
Ancylis transientana Filipjev, 1925
Ancylis uncella ([Denis & Schiffermüller], 1775)
Ancylis unculana (Haworth, 1811)
Ancylis unguicella (Linnaeus, 1758)
Ancylis upupana (Treitschke, 1835)
Aphelia aglossana (Kennel, 1899)
Aphelia albociliana (Herrich-Schäffer, 1851)
Aphelia amplana (Hübner, [1813])
Aphelia caradjana Caradja, 1916
Aphelia caucasica Kostjuk, 1975
Aphelia disjuncta (Filipjev, 1924)
Aphelia euxina (Djakonov, 1929)
Aphelia ferugana (Hübner, 1793)
Aphelia inumbratana (Christoph, 1881)
Aphelia paleana (Hübner, 1793)
Aphelia plagiferana (Rebel, 1916)
Aphelia polyglochina Razowski, 1981
Aphelia septentrionalis Obraztsov, 1959
Aphelia stigmatana (Eversmann, 1844)
Aphelia tshetverikovi Danilevsky, 1963
Aphelia unitana (Hübner, [1799])
Aphelia viburnana ([Denis & Schiffermüller], 1775)
Apotomis algidana Krogerus, 1946
Apotomis betuletana (Haworth, 1811)
Apotomis boreana Krogerus, 1946
Apotomis capreana (Hübner, [1817])
Apotomis demissana Kennel, 1900
Apotomis fraterculana Krogerus, 1946
Apotomis frigidana (Packard, 1867)
Apotomis infida (Heinrich, 1926)
Apotomis inundana ([Denis & Schiffermüller], 1775)
Apotomis lemniscatana (Kennel, 1901)
Apotomis lineana ([Denis & Schiffermüller], 1775)
Apotomis lutosana Kennel, 1901
Apotomis moestana (Wocke, 1862)
Apotomis monotona Kuznetzov, 1962
Apotomis sauciana (Frolich, 1828)
Apotomis semifasciana (Haworth, 1811)
Apotomis sororculana (Zetterstedt, 1839)
Apotomis stagnana Kuzuetzov, 1962
Apotomis turbidana Hübner, [1825]
Apotomis vaccinii Kuznetzov, 1969
Apotomis vigens Falkovitsh, 1966
Archips asiaticus Walsingham, 1900
Archips audax Razowski, 1977
Archips betulanus (Hübner, 1787)
Archips breviplicanus Walsingham, 1900
Archips capsigeranus (Kennel, 1901)
Archips crataeganus (Hübner, [1799])
Archips dichotomus Falkovitsh, 1965
Archips fumosus Kodama, 1960
Archips fuscocupreanus Walsingham, 1900
Archips ingentanus (Christoph, 1881)
Archips issikii Kodama, 1960
Archips nigricaudanus (Walsingham, 1900)
Archips oporanus (Linnaeus, 1758)
Archips podanus (Scopoli, 1763)
Archips pulcher (Butler, 1879)
Archips rosanus (Linnaeus, 1758)
Archips subrufanus (Snellen, 1883)
Archips viola Falkovitsh, 1965
Archips virescana (Clemens, 1865)
Archips xylosteanus (Linnaeus, 1758)
Argyroploce aquilonana (Karvonen, 1932)
Argyroploce arbutella (Linnaeus, 1758)
Argyroploce concretana (Wocke, 1862)
Argyroploce exaridana (Kuznetzov, 1991)
Argyroploce externa (Eversmann, 1844)
Argyroploce kamtshadala (Falkovitsh, 1966)
Argyroploce lediana (Linnaeus, 1758)
Argyroploce magadana (Falkovitsh, 1965)
Argyroploce mengelana (Femald, 1894)
Argyroploce noricana (Herrich-Schäffer, 1851)
Argyroploce roseomaculana (Herrich-Schäffer, 1851)
Argyrotaenia ljungiana (Thunberg, 1797)
Asketria kenteana (Staudinger, 1892)
Asketria kerzhneri Kuznetzov, 1972
Aterpia andereggana Guenée, 1845
Aterpia chalybeia Falkovitsh, 1966
Aterpia circumfluxana (Christoph, 1881)
Aterpia corticana ([Denis & Schiffermüller], 1775)
Aterpia flavens Falkovitsh, 1966
Aterpia flavipunctana (Christoph, 1882)
Aterpia sieversiana (Nolcken, 1870)
Bactra bactrana (Kennel, 1901)
Bactra extrema Diakonoff, 1962
Bactra festa Diakonoff, 1959
Bactra furfurana (Haworth, 1811)
Bactra lacteana Caradja, 1916
Bactra lancealana (Hübner,[1799])
Bactra loeligeri Diakonoff, 1956
Bactra robustana (Christoph, 1872)
Bactra suedana Bengtsson, 1989
Barbara fulgens (Kuznetzov, 1969)
Cacoecimorpha pronubana (Hübner, [1799])
Capricornia boisduvaliana (Duponchel, 1836)
Capua vulgana (Frolich, 1828)
Celypha anatoliana (Caradja, 1916)
Celypha aurofasciana (Haworth, 1811)
Celypha cacuminana (Kennel, 1901)
Celypha capreolana (Herrich-Schäffer, 1851)
Celypha cespitana (Hübner, [1817])
Celypha confictana (Kennel, 1901)
Celypha electana (Kennel, 1901)
Celypha flavipalpana (Herrich-Schäffer, 1851)
Celypha fraudulentana (Kennel, 1901)
Celypha ineptana (Kennel, 1901)
Celypha kostjukorum Budashkin & Dubatolov, 2006
Celypha rosaceana (Schlager, 1847)
Celypha rufana (Scopoli, 1763)
Celypha rurestrana (Duponchel, 1843)
Celypha striana ([Denis & Schiffermüller], 1775)
Celypha tephrea (Falkovitsh, 1966)
Cerace xanthocosma Diakonoff, 1950
Ceratoxanthis argentomixtana (Staudinger, 1871)
Ceratoxanthis externana (Eversmann, 1844)
Choristoneura albaniana (Walker, 1863)
Choristoneura diversana (Hübner, [1817])
Choristoneura evanidana (Kennel, 1901)
Choristoneura hebenstreitella (Muller, 1764)
Choristoneura improvisana (Kuznetzov, 1973)
Choristoneura issikii (Yasuda, 1962)
Choristoneura lafauryana (Ragonot, 1875)
Choristoneura longicellana (Walsingham, 1900)
Choristoneura luticostana (Christoph, 1888)
Choristoneura murinana (Hübner, [1799])
Clepsis aerosana (Lederer, 1853)
Clepsis altaica (Caradja, 1916)
Clepsis altitudinaria (Filipjev, 1962)
Clepsis celsana (Kennel, 1919)
Clepsis chishimana Oku, 1965
Clepsis consimilana (Hübner, [1817])
Clepsis crispinana (Kennel, 1919)
Clepsis danilevskyi Kostjuk, 1973
Clepsis insignata Oku, 1963
Clepsis mehli (Opheim, 1964)
Clepsis moeschleriana (Wocke, 1862)
Clepsis neglectana (Herrich-Schäffer, 1851)
Clepsis pallidana (Fabricius, 1776)
Clepsis phaeana (Rebel, 1916)
Clepsis plumbeolana (Bremer, 1864)
Clepsis praeclarana (Kennel, 1899)
Clepsis rogana (Guenée, 1845)
Clepsis rolandriana (Linnaeus, 1758)
Clepsis rurinana (Linnaeus, 1758)
Clepsis senecionana (Hübner, [1819])
Clepsis spectrana (Treitschke, 1830)
Clepsis steineriana (Hübner, [1799])
Clepsis tannuolana Kostjuk, 1973
Cnephasia abrasana (Duponchel, 1843)
Cnephasia alticola Kuznetzov, 1966
Cnephasia alticolana (Herrich-Schäffer, 1851)
Cnephasia asseclana ([Denis & Schiffermüller], 1775)
Cnephasia chrysantheana (Duponchel, 1843)
Cnephasia communana (Herrich-Schäffer, 1851)
Cnephasia genitalana Pierce & Metcalfe, 1922
Cnephasia hellenica Obraztsov, 1956
Cnephasia heringi Razowski, 1958
Cnephasia incertana (Treitschke, 1835)
Cnephasia longana (Haworth, 1811)
Cnephasia nowickii Razowski, 1958
Cnephasia orientana (Alphéraky, 1876)
Cnephasia pasiuana (Hübner, [1799])
Cnephasia personatana Kennel, 1901
Cnephasia sedana (Constant, 1884)
Cnephasia stephensiana (Doubleday, 1849)
Cnephasia tianshanica Filipjev, 1934
Cnephasia ussurica Filipjev, 1962
Coccyx posticana (Zetterstedt, 1839)
Coccyx tessulatana (Staudinger, 1871)
Coccyx turionella (Linnaeus, 1758)
Cochylidia contumescens (Meyrick, 1931)
Cochylidia heydeniana (Herrich-Schäffer, 1851)
Cochylidia implicitana (Wocke, 1856)
Cochylidia moguntiana (Rossler, 1864)
Cochylidia richteriana (Fischer von Röslerstamm, 1837)
Cochylidia rupicola (Curtis, 1834)
Cochylidia subroseana (Haworth, 1811)
Cochylimorpha alternana (Stephens, 1834)
Cochylimorpha arenosana Kuznetzov, Jalava & Kullberg, 1998
Cochylimorpha asiana (Kennel, 1899)
Cochylimorpha blandana (Eversmann, 1844)
Cochylimorpha clathrana (Staudinger, 1871)
Cochylimorpha clathratana (Staudinger, 1879)
Cochylimorpha cultana (Lederer, 1855)
Cochylimorpha declivana (Kennel, 1901)
Cochylimorpha despectana (Kennel, 1899)
Cochylimorpha discolorana (Kennel, 1899)
Cochylimorpha discopunctana (Eversmann, 1844)
Cochylimorpha elongana (Fischer von Röslerstamm, 1839)
Cochylimorpha fucatana (Snellen, 1883)
Cochylimorpha fuscimacula (Falkovitsh, 1963)
Cochylimorpha halophilana (Christoph, 1872)
Cochylimorpha hedemanniana (Snellen, 1883)
Cochylimorpha hilarana (Herrich-Schäffer, 1851)
Cochylimorpha ignicolorana Junnilainen & Nupponen, 2001
Cochylimorpha jaculana (Snellen, 1883)
Cochylimorpha jucundana (Treitschke, 1835)
Cochylimorpha meridiana (Staudinger, 1859)
Cochylimorpha nodulana (Moschler, 1862)
Cochylimorpha nomadana (Erschoff, 1874)
Cochylimorpha obliquana (Eversmann, 1844)
Cochylimorpha pallens (Kuznetzov, 1966)
Cochylimorpha perturbatana (Kennel, 1900)
Cochylimorpha pyramidana (Staudinger, 1871)
Cochylimorpha straminea (Haworth, 1811)
Cochylimorpha subwoliniana (Danilevsky, 1962)
Cochylimorpha triangulifera (Kuznetzov, 1966)
Cochylimorpha woliniana (Schleich, 1868)
Cochylis atricapitana (Stephens, 1852)
Cochylis defessana (Mann, 1861)
Cochylis discerta Razowski, 1970
Cochylis dubitana (Hübner, [1799])
Cochylis epilinana Duponchel, 1842
Cochylis flaviciliana (Westwood, 1854)
Cochylis hybridella (Hübner, [1813])
Cochylis nana (Haworth, 1811)
Cochylis pallidana Zeller, 1847
Cochylis posterana Zeller, 1847
Cochylis roseana (Haworth, 1811)
Cochylis salebrana (Mann, 1862)
Coenobiodes abietiella (Matsumura, 1931)
Crocidosema plebejana Zeller, 1847
Cryptocochylis conjunctana (Mann, 1864)
Cydia acerivora (Danilevsky, 1968)
Cydia amplana (Hübner, [1800])
Cydia amurensis (Danilevsky, 1968)
Cydia astragalana (Staudinger, 1871)
Cydia cognatana (Barrett, 1874)
Cydia coniferana (Saxesen, 1840)
Cydia cornucopiae (Tengstrom, 1869)
Cydia corollana (Hübner, [1823])
Cydia cosmophorana (Treitschke, 1835)
Cydia danilevskyi (Kuznetzov, 1973)
Cydia duplicana (Zetterstedt, 1839)
Cydia ermolenkoi (Danilevsky, 1968)
Cydia exquisitana (Rebel, 1889)
Cydia fagiglandana (Zeller, 1841)
Cydia glandicolana (Danilevsky, 1968)
Cydia grunertiana (Ratzeburg, 1868)
Cydia illustrana (Kuznetzov, 1986)
Cydia illutana (Herrich-Schäffer, 1851)
Cydia indivisa (Danilevsky, 1963)
Cydia informosana (Walker, 1863)
Cydia inquinatana (Hübner, [1799])
Cydia intexta (Kuznetzov, 1962)
Cydia johanssoni Aarvik &, Karsholt, 1993
Cydia kurilana (Kuznetzov, 1976)
Cydia laricicolana (Kuznetzov, 1960)
Cydia leguminana (Lienig & Zeller, 1846)
Cydia leucogrammana (Hofmann, 1898)
Cydia maackiana (Danilevsky, 1963)
Cydia medicaginis (Kumetzov, 1962)
Cydia microgrammana (Guenée, 1845)
Cydia milleniana (Adamczewski, 1967)
Cydia nigricana (Fabricius, 1794)
Cydia oxytropidis (Martini, 1912)
Cydia pactolana (Zeller, 1840)
Cydia perelegans (Kuznetzov, 1962)
Cydia phalacris (Meyrick, 1912)
Cydia pomonella (Linnaeus, 1758)
Cydia populana (Busck, 1916)
Cydia pyrivora (Danilevsky, 1947)
Cydia secretana (Kuznetzov, 1973)
Cydia seductana (Kuznetzov, 1962)
Cydia servillana (Duponchel, 1836)
Cydia strobilella (Linnaeus, 1758)
Cydia succedana ([Denis & Schiffermüller], 1775)
Cydia trasias (Meyrick, 1928)
Cydia triangulella (Goeze, 1783)
Cydia zebeana (Ratzeburg, 1840)
Cymolomia hartigiana (Saxesen, 1840)
Cymolomia taigana Falkovitsh, 1966
Daemilus fulvus (Filipjev, 1962)
Danilevskia silvana Kuznetzov, 1970
Dentisociaria armata Kumetzov, 1970
Diceratura ostrinana (Guenée, 1845)
Diceratura roseofasciana (Mann, 1855)
Dichelia histrionana (Frolich, 1828)
Dichrorampha abhasica Danilevsky, 1968
Dichrorampha acuminatana (Lienig & Zeller, 1846)
Dichrorampha aeratana (Pierce & Metcalfe, 1915)
Dichrorampha agilana (Tengstrom, 1848)
Dichrorampha alaicana Rebel, 1910
Dichrorampha albimacula (Danilevsky, 1948)
Dichrorampha alpigenana (Heinemann, 1863)
Dichrorampha alpinana (Treitschke, 1830)
Dichrorampha altaica Danilevsky, 1968
Dichrorampha ambrosiana (Kennel, 1919)
Dichrorampha cacaleana (Herrich-Schäffer, 1851)
Dichrorampha cancellatana Kennel, 1901
Dichrorampha caucasica (Danilevsky, 1948)
Dichrorampha cinerascens (Danilevsky, 1948)
Dichrorampha coniana Obraztsov, 1953
Dichrorampha consortana (Stephens, 1852)
Dichrorampha danilevskyi Obraztsov, 1958
Dichrorampha eximia (Danilevsky, 1948)
Dichrorampha filipjjevi (Danilevsky, 1948)
Dichrorampha flavidorsana Knaggs, 1867
Dichrorampha gruneriana (Herrich-Schäffer, 1851)
Dichrorampha gueneeana Obraztsov, 1953
Dichrorampha heegerana (Duponchel, 1843)
Dichrorampha incognitana (Kremky & Maslowski, 1933)
Dichrorampha incursana (Herrich-Schäffer, 1851)
Dichrorampha infuscata (Danilevsky, 1960)
Dichrorampha insperata (Danilevsky, 1960)
Dichrorampha interponana (Danilevsky, 1960)
Dichrorampha klimeschiana Toll, 1955
Dichrorampha larsana (Danilevsky, 1960)
Dichrorampha latiflavana Caradja, 1916
Dichrorampha montanana (Duponchel, 1843)
Dichrorampha nigrobrunneana (Toll, 1942)
Dichrorampha obscuratana (Wolff, 1955)
Dichrorampha okui Komai, 1979
Dichrorampha petiverella (Linnaeus, 1758)
Dichrorampha plumbagana (Treitschke, 1830)
Dichrorampha plumbana (Scopoli, 1763)
Dichrorampha proxima (Danilevsky, 1948)
Dichrorampha rjabovi (Danilevsky, 1948)
Dichrorampha sedatana Busck, 1906
Dichrorampha sequana (Hübner, [1799])
Dichrorampha simpliciana (Haworth, 1811)
Dichrorampha tshetverikovi (Danilevsky, 1960)
Dichrorampha unicolor (Danilevsky, 1948)
Dichrorampha uralensis (Danilevsky, 1948)
Diplocalyptis congruentana (Kennel, 1901)
Doloploca buraetica Staudinger, 1892
Doloploca praeviella (Erschoff, 1877)
Doloploca punctulana ([Denis & Schiffermüller], 1775)
Eana agricolana (Kennel, 1919)
Eana andreana (Kennel, 1919)
Eana argentana (Clerck, 1759)
Eana canescana (Guenée, 1845)
Eana characterana (Snellen, 1883)
Eana derivana (La Harpe, 1858)
Eana incanana (Stephens, 1852)
Eana osseana (Scopoli, 1763)
Eana penziana (Thunberg, 1791)
Eana vetulana (Christoph, 1881)
Enarmonia formosana (Scopoli, 1763)
Enarmonia minuscula Kuznetzov, 1981
Enarmonodes aino Kuznetzov, 1968
Enarmonodes kunashirica (Kuznetzov, 1969)
Enarmonodes recreantana (Kennel, 1900)
Enarmonopsis major (Walsingham, 1900)
Endothenia atrata (Caradja, 1926)
Endothenia austerana (Kennel, 1916)
Endothenia designata Kuznetzov, 1970
Endothenia ericetana (Humphreys & Westwood, 1845)
Endothenia furvida Falkovitsh, 1970
Endothenia gentianaeana (Hübner, [1799])
Endothenia hebesana (Walker, 1863)
Endothenia informalis (Meyrick, 1935)
Endothenia ingrata Falkovitsh, 1970
Endothenia kostjuki Kuznetzov, 1993
Endothenia lapideana (Herrich-Schäffer, 1851)
Endothenia limata Falkovitsh, 1962
Endothenia marginana (Haworth, 1811)
Endothenia menthivora (Oku, 1963)
Endothenia nigricostana (Haworth, 1811)
Endothenia oblongana (Haworth, 1811)
Endothenia pullana (Haworth, 1811)
Endothenia quadrimaculana (Haworth, 1811)
Endothenia remigera Falkovitsh, 1970
Endothenia sororiana (Herrich-Schäffer, 1850)
Endothenia ustulana (Haworth, 1811)
Endothenia villosula Falkovitsh, 1966
Epagoge grotiana (Fabricius, 1781)
Epibactra immundana (Eversmann, 1844)
Epiblema acceptana (Snellen, 1883)
Epiblema angulatana Kennel, 1901
Epiblema autolitha (Meyrick, 1931)
Epiblema banghaasi Kennel, 1901
Epiblema cirsiana (Zeller, 1843)
Epiblema confusana (Herrich-Schäffer, 1851)
Epiblema costipunctana (Haworth, 1811)
Epiblema ermolenkoi Kuznetzov, 1968
Epiblema expressana (Christoph, 1882)
Epiblema foenella (Linnaeus, 1758)
Epiblema grandaevana (Lienig & Zeller, 1846)
Epiblema graphana (Treitschke, 1835)
Epiblema hepaticana (Treitschke, 1835)
Epiblema inconspicua (Walsingham, 1900)
Epiblema junctana (Herrich-Schäffer, 1856)
Epiblema kostjuki Kuznetzov, 1973
Epiblema obscurana (Herrich-Schäffer, 1851)
Epiblema otiosana (Clemens, 1860)
Epiblema pryerana (Walsingham, 1900)
Epiblema quinquefasciana (Matsumura, 1900)
Epiblema rimosana (Christoph, 1882)
Epiblema sarmatana (Christoph, 1872)
Epiblema scutulana ([Denis & Schiffermüller], 1775)
Epiblema similana ([Denis & Schiffermüller], 1775)
Epiblema simploniana (Duponchel, 1835)
Epiblema sticticana (Fabricius, 1794)
Epiblema turbidana (Treitschke, 1835)
Epinotia abbreviana (Fabncius, 1794)
Epinotia aciculana Falkovitsh, 1965
Epinotia albiguttata (Oku, 1974)
Epinotia aquila Kuznetzov, 1968
Epinotia autonoma Falkovitsh, 1965
Epinotia bicolor (Walsingham, 1900)
Epinotia bilunana (Haworth, 1811)
Epinotia brunnichiana (Linnaeus, 1767)
Epinotia caprana (Fabricius, 1798)
Epinotia cinereana (Haworth, 1811)
Epinotia contrariana (Christoph, 1882)
Epinotia coryli Kuznetzov, 1970
Epinotia crenana (Hübner, [1799])
Epinotia cruciana (Linnaeus, 1761)
Epinotia dalmatana (Rebel, 1891)
Epinotia demarniana (Fischer von Röslerstamm, 1840)
Epinotia densiuncaria Kuznetzov, 1985
Epinotia exquisitana (Christoph, 1882)
Epinotia festivana (Hübner, [1799])
Epinotia fraternana (Haworth, 1811)
Epinotia gimmerthaliana (Lienig & Zeller, 1846)
Epinotia granitana (Herrich-Schäffer, 1851)
Epinotia immundana (Fischer von Röslerstamm, 1839)
Epinotia indecorana (Zetterstedt, 1839)
Epinotia kochiana (Herrich-Schäffer, 1851)
Epinotia maculana (Fabricius, 1775)
Epinotia majorana (Caradja, 1916)
Epinotia medioplagata (Walsingham, 1895)
Epinotia mercuriana (Frolich, 1828)
Epinotia nanana (Treitschke, 1835)
Epinotia nemorivaga (Tengstrom, 1848)
Epinotia nigricana (Herrich-Schäffer, 1851)
Epinotia nisella (Clerck, 1759)
Epinotia notoceliana Kuznetzov, 1985
Epinotia parki Bae, 1997
Epinotia pentagonana (Kennel, 1901)
Epinotia piceae Issiki, 1961
Epinotia piceicola Kuznetzov, 1970
Epinotia pinicola (Kuznetzov, 1969)
Epinotia pusillana (Peyerimhoff, 1863)
Epinotia pygmaeana (Hübner, [1799])
Epinotia ramella (Linnaeus, 1758)
Epinotia rasdolnyana (Christoph, 1882)
Epinotia rubiginosana (Herrich-Schäffer, 1851)
Epinotia rubricana Kuznetzov, 1968
Epinotia salicicolana Kuznetzov, 1968
Epinotia signatana (Douglas, 1845)
Epinotia solandriana (Linnaeus, 1758)
Epinotia sordidana (Hübner, [1824])
Epinotia subocellana (Donovan, 1806)
Epinotia subuculana (Rebel, 1903)
Epinotia tedella (Clerck, 1759)
Epinotia tenerana ([Denis & Schiffermüller], 1775)
Epinotia tetraquetrana (Haworth, 1811)
Epinotia thapsiana (Zeller, 1847)
Epinotia trigonella (Linnaeus, 1758)
Epinotia ulmi Kuznetzov, 1966
Epinotia ulmicola Kuznetzov, 1966
Epinotia unisignana Kuznetzov, 1962
Eriopsela daniilevskyi Kuznetzov, 1972
Eriopsela falkovitshi Kostjuk, 1979
Eriopsela mongunana Kostjuk, 1973
Eriopsela quadrana (Hübner, [1813])
Eriopsela rosinana (Kennel, 1918)
Eucoenogenes teliferana (Christoph, 1882)
Eucosma abacana (Erscho ff, 1877)
Eucosma aemulana (Schlager, 1849)
Eucosma agnatana (Christoph, 1872)
Eucosma albidulana (Herrich-Schäffer, 1851)
Eucosma apocrypha Falkovitsh, 1964
Eucosma argentifera Razowski, 1972
Eucosma aspidiscana (Htibner, [1817])
Eucosma aurantiradix Kuznetzov, 1962
Eucosma balatonana (Osthelder, 1937)
Eucosma brigittana (Kennel, 1919)
Eucosma campoliliana ([Denis & Schiffermüller], 1775)
Eucosma cana (Haworth, 1811)
Eucosma catharaspis (Meyrick, 1931)
Eucosma catoptrana (Rebel, 1903)
Eucosma certana Kumetzov, 1967
Eucosma chrysyphis Razowski, 1972
Eucosma clarescens Kumetzov, 1964
Eucosma coagulana (Kennel, 1901)
Eucosma conformana (Mann, 1872)
Eucosma confunda Kumetzov, 1966
Eucosma conterminana (Guenée, 1845)
Eucosma cumulana (Guenée, 1845)
Eucosma denigratana (Kennel, 1901)
Eucosma discernata Kumetzov, 1966
Eucosma explicatana (Kennel, 1900)
Eucosma fervidana (Zel1er, 1847)
Eucosma flavispecula Kumetzov, 1964
Eucosma fuscida Kumetzov, 1966
Eucosma getonia Razowski, 1972
Eucosma glebana (Snellen, 1883)
Eucosma gorodkovi Kumetzov, 1979
Eucosma gracilis (Filipjev, 1924)
Eucosma gradensis (Galvagni, 1909)
Eucosma guentheri (Tengstrom, 1869)
Eucosma hohenwartiana ([Denis & Schiffermüller], 1775)
Eucosma ignotana (Caradja, 1916)
Eucosma intermediana (Kennel, 1900)
Eucosma jaceana (Herrich-Schäffer, 1851)
Eucosma krygeri (Rebel, 1937)
Eucosma lacteana (Treitschke, 1835)
Eucosma lignana (Snellen, 1883)
Eucosma luciana (Kennel, 1919)
Eucosma lugubrana (Treitschke, 1830)
Eucosma lyrana (Snellen, 1883)
Eucosma messingiana (Fischer von Röslerstamm, 1837)
Eucosma metzneriana (Treitschke, 1830)
Eucosma monstratana (Rebel, 1906)
Eucosma muguraxana Kostjuk, 1975
Eucosma nitorana Kumetzov, 1962
Eucosma niveicaput (Walsingham, 1900)
Eucosma obumbratana (Lienig & Zeller, 1846)
Eucosma ochricostana Razowski, 1972
Eucosma oculatana (Kennel, 1900)
Eucosma ommatoptera Falkovitsh, 1965
Eucosma paetulana (Kennel, 1900)
Eucosma pergratana (Rebel, 1914)
Eucosma pupillana (Clerck, 1759)
Eucosma rigidana (Snellen, 1883)
Eucosma saussureana (Benander, 1928)
Eucosma scorzonerana (Benander, 1942)
Eucosma scutana (Constant, 1893)
Eucosma striatiradix Kuznetzov, 1964
Eucosma suomiana (Hoffmann, 1893)
Eucosma sybillana (Kennel, 1919)
Eucosma tenebrana (Christoph, 1882)
Eucosma tetraplana (Moschler, 1866)
Eucosma tundrana (Kennel, 1900)
Eucosma ursulana (Kennel, 1919)
Eucosma victoriana (Kennel, 1919)
Eucosma wimmerana (Treitschke, 1835)
Eucosma yasudai Nasu, 1982
Eucosmomorpha albersana (Hübner, [1813])
Eucosmomorpha multicolor Kuznetzov, 1964
Eudemis porphyrana (Hübner, [1799])
Eudemis profundana ([Denis & Schiffermüller], 1775)
Eudemopsis purpurissatana (Kennel, 1901)
Eugnosta dives (Butler, 1878)
Eugnosta falarica Razowski, 1970
Eugnosta fenestrana Razowski, 1964
Eugnosta hydrargyrana (Eversmann, 1842)
Eugnosta lathoniana (Hübner, [1799])
Eugnosta magnificana (Rebel, 1914)
Eugnosta parreyssiana (Duponchel, 1843)
Eugnosta ussuriana (Caradja, 1926)
Eulia ministrana (Linnaeus, 1758)
Eupoecilia ambiguella (Hübner, 1796)
Eupoecilia angustana (Hübner, [1799])
Eupoecilia cebrana (Hübner,[1813])
Eupoecilia citrinana Razowski, 1960
Eupoecilia inouei Kawabe, 1972
Eupoecilia sanguisorbana (Herrich-Schäffer, 1856)
Eurydoxa advena Filipjev, 1930
Exapate congelatella (Clerck, 1759)
Falseuncaria degreyana (McLachlan, 1869)
Falseuncaria kaszabi Razowski, 1966
Falseuncaria lechriotoma Razowski, 1970
Falseuncaria rjaboviana Kuznetzov, 1979
Falseuncaria ruficiliana (Haworth, 1811)
Fulcrifera luteiceps (Kuznetzov, 1962)
Fulcrifera orientis (Kuznetzov, 1966)
Fulvoclysia defectana (Lederer, 1870)
Fulvoclysia nerminae Kocak, 1982
Fulvoclysia pallorana (Lederer, 1864)
Fulvoclysia rjabovi Kumetzov, 1976
Gibberifera mienshana Kuznetzov, 1971
Gibberifera simplana (Fischer von Röslerstamm, 1836)
Gnorismoneura orientis (Filipjev, 1962)
Grapholita andabatana (Wolff, 1957)
Grapholita aureolana (Tengstrom, 1848)
Grapholita auroscriptana Caradja, 1916
Grapholita caecana (Schlager, 1847)
Grapholita compositella (Fabricius, 1775)
Grapholita coronillana (Lienig & Zeller, 1846)
Grapholita cotoneastri (Danilevsky, 1968)
Grapholita delineana (Walker, 1863)
Grapholita difficilana (Walsingham, 1900)
Grapholita dimorpha Komai, 1979
Grapholita discretana (Wocke, 1861)
Grapholita endrosias (Meyrick, 1907)
Grapholita fimana (Snellen, 1883)
Grapholita fisana (Frolich, 1828)
Grapholita funebrana (Treitschke, 1835)
Grapholita gemmiferana (Treitschke, 1835)
Grapholita glycyrrhizana (Kuznetzov, 1962)
Grapholita inopinata (Heinrich, 1928)
Grapholita janthinana (Duponchel, 1843)
Grapholita jesonica (Matsumura, 1931)
Grapholita jungiella (Linnaeus, 1761)
Grapholita lathyrana (Hübner, [1813])
Grapholita lobarzewskii (Nowicki, 1860)
Grapholita lunulana ([Denis & Schiffermüller], 1775)
Grapholita molesta (Busck, 1916)
Grapholita nebritana (Treitschke, 1830)
Grapholita nigrostriana (Snellen, 1883)
Grapholita orobana (Treitschke, 1830)
Grapholita pallifrontana (Lienig & Zeller, 1846)
Grapholita rosana (Danilevsky, 1968)
Grapholita scintillana (Christoph, 1882)
Grapholita semifusca (Kuznetzov, 1968)
Grapholita tenebrosana (Duponchel, 1843)
Gravitarmata margarotana (Heinemann, 1863)
Gravitarmata osmana Obraztsov, 1952
Gynnidomorpha affinitana (Douglas, 1846)
Gynnidomorpha albipalpana (Zeller, 1847)
Gynnidomorpha aliena (Kumetzov, 1966)
Gynnidomorpha alismana (Ragonot, 1883)
Gynnidomorpha chlorolitha (Meyrick, 1931)
Gynnidomorpha contractana (Zeller, 1847)
Gynnidomorpha curvistrigana (Stainton, 1859)
Gynnidomorpha dysodona (Caradja, 1916)
Gynnidomorpha fraterna (Razowski, 1970)
Gynnidomorpha fulvimixta (Filipjev, 1940)
Gynnidomorpha gilvicomana (Zeller, 1847)
Gynnidomorpha latifasciana (Razowski, 1970)
Gynnidomorpha luridana (Gregson, 1870)
Gynnidomorpha lydiae (Filipjev, 1940)
Gynnidomorpha manniana (Fischer von Röslerstamm, 1839)
Gynnidomorpha minimana (Caradja, 1916)
Gynnidomorpha permixtana ([Denis & Schiffermüller], 1775)
Gynnidomorpha rubricana (Peyerimhoff, 1877)
Gynnidomorpha silvestris (Kuznetzov, 1966)
Gynnidomorpha vectisana (Humphreys & Westwood, 1845)
Gynnidomorpha zygota (Razowski, 1970)
Gypsonoma attrita Falkovitsh, 1965
Gypsonoma bifasciata Kuznetzov, 1966
Gypsonoma contorta Kuznetzov, 1966
Gypsonoma dealbana (Frolich, 1828)
Gypsonoma ephoropa (Meyrick, 1931)
Gypsonoma holocrypta (Meyrick, 1931)
Gypsonoma maritima Kuznetzov, 1970
Gypsonoma mica Kuznetzov, 1966
Gypsonoma minutana (Hübner, [1799])
Gypsonoma monotonica Kuznetzov, 1991
Gypsonoma mutabilana Kuznetzov, 1985
Gypsonoma nitidulana (Lienig & Zeller, 1846)
Gypsonoma oppressana (Treitschke, 1835)
Gypsonoma parryana (Curtis, 1835)
Gypsonoma sociana (Haworth, 1811)
Hedya abjecta Falkovitsh, 1962
Hedya dimidiana (Clerck, 1759)
Hedya dimidioalba (Retzius, 1783)
Hedya ignara Falkovitsh, 1962
Hedya inornata (Walsingham, 1900)
Hedya ochroleucana (Frolich, 1828)
Hedya perspicuana (Kennel, 1901)
Hedya pruniana (Hübner, [1799])
Hedya salicella (Linnaeus, 1758)
Hedya semiassana (Kennel, 1901)
Hedya vicinana (Ragonot, 1894)
Hedya walsinghami Oku, 1974
Homonopsis foederatana (Kennel, 1901)
Homonopsis illotana (Kennel, 1901)
Homonopsis rubens Kumetzov, 1976
Hysterophora maculosana (Haworth, 1812)
Isotrias rectifasciana (Haworth, 1811)
Kawabea ignavana (Christoph, 1881)
Kennelia xylinana (Kennel, 1900)
Laspeyresinia aeologlypta (Meyrick, 1936)
Lathronympha albimacula Kuznetzov, 1962
Lathronympha strigana (Fabricius, 1775)
Leguminivora glycinivorella (Matsumura, 1900)
Lepteucosma huebneriana (Kocak, 1980)
Lobesia abscisana (Doubleday, 1849)
Lobesia artemisiana (Zeller, 1847)
Lobesia bicinctana (Duponchel, 1844)
Lobesia botrana ([Denis & Schiffermüller], 1775)
Lobesia duplicata Falkovitsh, 1970
Lobesia indusiana (Zeller, 1847)
Lobesia reliquana Hilbner, [1825]
Lobesia subherculeana (Filipjev, 1924)
Lobesia virulenta Bae & Komai, 1991
Lobesia yasudai Bae & Komai, 1991
Lobesiodes euphorbiana (Freyer, 1842)
Lobesiodes occidentis Falkovitsh, 1970
Lozotaenia coniferana (Issiki, 1961)
Lozotaenia djakonovi Danilevsky, 1963
Lozotaenia forsterana (Fabricius, 1781)
Lozotaenia kumatai Oku, 1963
Matsumuraeses capax Razowski & Yasuda, 1975
Matsumuraeses falcana (Walsingham, 1900)
Matsumuraeses phaseoli (Matsumura, 1900)
Matsumuraeses ussuriensis (Caradja, 1916)
Metacosma impolitana Kuznetzov, 1985
Metendothenia atropunctana (Zetterstedt, 1839)
Microcorses mirabilis Kuznetzov, 1964
Microcorses trigonana (Walsingham, 1900)
Mimarsinania pelulantana (Kennel, 1901)
Neocalyptis angustilineata (Walsingham, 1900)
Neocalyptis liratana (Christoph, 1881)
Neolobesia coccophaga (Falkovitsh, 1970)
Neosphaleroptera nubilana (Hübner, [1799])
Notocelia cynosbatella (Linnaeus, 1758)
Notocelia incarnatana (Hübner, 1800)
Notocelia nimia Falkovitsh, 1965
Notocelia roborana ([Denis & Schiffermüller], 1775)
Notocelia rosaecolana (Doubleday, 1849)
Notocelia tetragonana (Stephens, 1834)
Notocelia trimaculana (Haworth, 1811)
Notocelia uddmanniana (Linnaeus, 1758)
Olethreutes arcuellus (Clerck, 1759)
Olethreutes avianus (Falkovitsh, 1959)
Olethreutes captiosanus (Falkovitsh, 1960)
Olethreutes obovatus (Walsingham, 1900)
Olethreutes spiraeanus Kumetzov, 1962
Olethreutes subtilanus (Falkovitsh, 1959)
Olindia schumacherana (Fabricius, 1787)
Oporopsamma wertheimsteini (Rebel, 1913)
Orientophiaris nigricrista (Kuznetzov, 1976)
Orthotaenia secunda Falkovitsh, 1962
Orthotaenia undulana ([Denis & Schiffermüller], 1775)
Oxypteron impar Staudinger, 1871
Oxypteron palmoni (Amsel, 1940)
Pammene aceris Kuznetzov, 1968
Pammene ainorum Kuznetzov, 1968
Pammene argyrana (Hübner, [1799])
Pammene aurana (Fabricius, 1775)
Pammene aurita Razowski, 1991
Pammene caeruleata Kuznetzov, 1970
Pammene christophana (Moschler, 1862)
Pammene clanculana (Tengstrom, 1869)
Pammene cytisana (Zeller, 1847)
Pammene exscribana Kuznetzov, 1986
Pammene fasciana (Linnaeus, 1761)
Pammene flavicellula Kuznetzov, 1971
Pammene gallicana (Guenée, 1845)
Pammene gallicolana (Lienig & Zeller, 1846)
Pammene germmana (Hübner, [1799])
Pammene griseomaculana Kuznetzov, 1960
Pammene grunini (Kuznetzov, 1960)
Pammene ignorata Kuznetzov, 1968
Pammene insolentana Kuznetzov, 1964
Pammene instructana Kuznetzov, 1964
Pammene insulana (Guenée, 1845)
Pammene japonica Kuzuetzov, 1968
Pammene luculentana Kuznetzov, 1962
Pammene luedersiana (Sorhagen, 1885)
Pammene mariana (Zerny, 1920)
Pammene monotincta Kuznetzov, 1976
Pammene nemorosa Kuznetzov, 1968
Pammene obscurana (Stephens, 1834)
Pammene ochsenheimeriana (Lienig & Zeller, 1846)
Pammene orientana Kuznetzov, 1960
Pammene populana (Fabricius, 1787)
Pammene regiana (Zeller, 1849)
Pammene rhediella (Clerck, 1759)
Pammene shicotanica Kuznetzov, 1968
Pammene splendidulana (Guenée, 1845)
Pammene subsalvana Kuznetzov, 1960
Pammene suspectana (Lienig & Zeller, 1846)
Pammene trauniana ([Denis & Schiffermüller], 1775)
Pammenodes glaucana (Kennel, 1901)
Pandemis cerasana (Hübner, 1796)
Pandemis chondrillana (Herrich-Schäffer, 1860)
Pandemis cinnamomeana (Treitschke, 1830)
Pandemis corylana (Fabricius, 1794)
Pandemis dumetana (Treitschke, 1835)
Pandemis heparana ([Denis & Schiffermüller], 1775)
Pandemis ignescana (Kuznetzov, 1976)
Paracroesia abievora (Issiki, 1961)
Paramesia gnomana (Clerck, 1759)
Parapammene aurifascia Kuzuetzov, 1981
Parapammene dichroramphana (Kennel, 1900)
Parapammene imitatrix Kuznetzov, 1986
Parapammene inobservata Kuznetzov, 1962
Parapammene selectana (Christoph, 1882)
Paratorna catenulella (Christoph, 1882)
Paratorna cuprescens Falkovitsh, 1965
Pelatea klugiana (Freyer, 1834)
Pelochrista apheliana (Kennel, 1901)
Pelochrista arabescana (Eversmann, 1844)
Pelochrista aristidana Rebel, 1910
Pelochrista caecimaculana (Hübner, [1799])
Pelochrista caementana (Christoph, 1872)
Pelochrista dagestana Obraztsov, 1949
Pelochrista danilevskyi Kostjuk, 1975
Pelochrista decolorana (Freyer, 1842)
Pelochrista disquei (Kennel, 1901)
Pelochrista figurana Razowski, 1972
Pelochrista huebneriana (Lienig & Zeller, 1846)
Pelochrista idotatana (Kennel, 1901)
Pelochrista infidana (Hübner, [1824])
Pelochrista jodocana (Kennel, 1919)
Pelochrista kuznetzovi Kostjuk, 1975
Pelochrista labyrinthicana (Christoph, 1872)
Pelochrista latericiana (Rebel, 1919)
Pelochrista lineolana Kumetzov, 1964
Pelochrista medullana (Staudinger, 1879)
Pelochrista metria Falkovitsh, 1964
Pelochrista modicana (Zeller, 1847)
Pelochrista mollitana (Zeller, 1847)
Pelochrista obscura Kuznetzov, 1978
Pelochrista ornata Kumetzov, 1967
Pelochrista ravana (Kennel, 1900)
Pelochrista tholera Falkovitsh, 1964
Pelochrista turiana (Zerny, 1927)
Pelochrista umbraculana (Eversmann, 1844)
Periclepsis cinctana ([Denis & Schiffermüller], 1775)
Peridaedala optabilana (Kuznetzov, 1979)
Phaneta bimaculata (Kuznetzov, 1966)
Phaneta pauperana (Duponchel, 1843)
Phaneta tarandana (Moschler, 1874)
Phiaris agatha (Falkovitsh, 1966)
Phiaris bidentata (Kumetzov, 1971)
Phiaris bipunctana (Fabricius, 1794)
Phiaris camillana (Kennel, 1919)
Phiaris delitana (Staudinger, 1880)
Phiaris dissolutana (Stange, 1866)
Phiaris dolosana (Kennel, 1901)
Phiaris examinata (Falkovitsh, 1966)
Phiaris exilis (Falkovitsh, 1966)
Phiaris glaciana (Moschler, 1860)
Phiaris heinrichana (McDunnough, 1927)
Phiaris hydrangeana (Kuznetzov, 1959)
Phiaris inquietana (Walker, 1863)
Phiaris metallicana (Hübner, [1799])
Phiaris micana ([Denis & Schiffermüller], 1775)
Phiaris nordeggana (McDunnough, 1922)
Phiaris obsoletana (Zetterstedt, 1839)
Phiaris orthocosma (Meyrick, 1931)
Phiaris palustrana (Lienig & Zeller, 1846)
Phiaris praeterminata (Caradja, 1933)
Phiaris schulziana (Fabricius, 1776)
Phiaris scoriana (Guenée, 1845)
Phiaris semicremana (Christoph, 1881)
Phiaris septentrionana (Curtis, 1831)
Phiaris stibiana (Guenée, 1845)
Phiaris transversana (Christoph, 1881)
Phiaris turfosana (Herrich-Schäffer, 1851)
Phiaris umbrosana (Freyer, 1842)
Philedone gerningana ([Denis & Schiffermüller], 1775)
Philedonides lunana (Thunberg, 1784)
Phtheochroa chalcantha (Meyrick, 1912)
Phtheochroa decipiens (Walsingham, 1900)
Phtheochroa exasperatana (Christoph, 1872)
Phtheochroa farinosana (Herrich-Schäffer, 1856)
Phtheochroa fulvicinctana (Constant, 1893)
Phtheochroa inopiana (Haworth, 1811)
Phtheochroa kenneli (Obraztsov, 1944)
Phtheochroa krulikovskii (Obraztsov, 1944)
Phtheochroa pistrinana (Erschoff, 1877)
Phtheochroa pulvillana (Herrich-Schäffer, 1851)
Phtheochroa retextana (Erschoff, 1874)
Phtheochroa schreibersiana (Frolich, 1828)
Phtheochroa sodaliana (Haworth, 1811)
Phtheochroa subfumida (Falkovitsh, 1963)
Phtheochroa thiana Staudinger, 1899
Phtheochroa unionana (Kennel, 1900)
Phtheochroa vulnerarana (Zetterstedt, 1839)
Phtheochroides apicana (Walsingham, 1900)
Phtheochroides clandestina Razowski, 1968
Piniphila bifasciana (Haworth, 1811)
Pristerognatha fuligana ([Denis & Schiffermüller], 1775)
Pristerognatha penthinana (Guenée, 1845)
Propiromorpha rhodophana (Herrich-Schäffer, 1851)
Pseudacroclita luteispecula (Kuznetzov, 1979)
Pseudargyrotoza conwagana (Fabricius, 1775)
Pseudeulia asinana (Hübner, [1799])
Pseudohedya cincinna Falkovitsh, 1962
Pseudohedya gradana (Christoph, 1882)
Pseudohedya retracta Falkovitsh, 1962
Pseudohermenias abietana (Fabricius, 1787)
Pseudohermenias ajanensis Falkovitsh, 1966
Pseudosciaphila branderiana (Linnaeus, 1758)
Ptycholoma erschoffi (Christoph, 1877)
Ptycholoma imitator (Walsingham, 1900)
Ptycholoma lecheana (Linnaeus, 1758)
Ptycholoma micantana (Kennel, 1901)
Ptycholomoides aeriferanus (Herrich-Schäffer, 1851)
Retinia coeruleostriana (Caradja, 1939)
Retinia immanitana (Kuznetzov, 1969)
Retinia lemniscata (Kuznetzov, 1973)
Retinia monopunctata (Oku, 1968)
Retinia perangustana (Snellen, 1883)
Retinia resinella (Linnaeus, 1758)
Rhopalovalva exartemana (Kennel, 1901)
Rhopalovalva grapholitana (Caradja, 1916)
Rhopalovalva lascivana (Christoph, 1882)
Rhopalovalva pulchra (Butler, 1879)
Rhopobota latipennis Walsingham, 1900
Rhopobota myrtillana (Humphreys & Westwood, 1845)
Rhopobota naevana (Hübner, [1817])
Rhopobota relicta (Kuznetzov, 1968)
Rhopobota stagnana ([Denis & Schiffermüller], 1775)
Rhopobota ustomaculana (Curtis, 1831)
Rhyacionia buoliana ([Denis & Schiffermüller], 1775)
Rhyacionia dativa Heinrich, 1928
Rhyacionia duplana (Hübner, [1813])
Rhyacionia logaea Durrant, 1911
Rhyacionia piniana (Herrich-Schäffer, 1851)
Rhyacionia pinicolana (Doubleday, 1849)
Rhyacionia pinivorana (Lienig & Zeller, 1846)
Rudisociaria expeditana (Snellen, 1883)
Rudisociaria irina (Falkovitsh, 1966)
Rudisociaria velutina (Walsingham, 1900)
Saliciphaga acharis (Butler, 1879)
Saliciphaga caesia Falkovitsh, 1962
Salsolicola stshetkini Kuznetzov, 1960
Selenodes karelica (Tengstrom, 1875)
Semnostola magnifica (Kuznetzov, 1964)
Semnostola trisignifera Kumetzov, 1970
Sillybiphora devia Kuznetzov, 1964
Sorolopha agana Falkovitsh, 1966
Sparganothis pilleriana ([Denis & Schiffermüller], 1775)
Sparganothis praecana (Kennel, 1900)
Sparganothis rubicundana (Herrich-Schäffer, 1856)
Spatalistis bifasciana (Hübner, 1787)
Spatalistis christophana (Walsingham, 1900)
Spatalistis egesta Razowski, 1974
Spilonota albicana (Motschulsky, 1866)
Spilonota eremitana Moriuti, 1972
Spilonota laricana (Heinemann, 1863)
Spilonota ocellana ([Denis & Schiffermüller], 1775)
Spilonota prognathana (Snellen, 1883)
Spilonota semirufana (Christoph, 1882)
Statherotmantis peregrina (Falkovitsh, 1966)
Statherotmantis pictana (Kuzuetzov, 1969)
Statherotmantis shicorana (Kuznetzov, 1969)
Stenopteron stenoptera (Filipjev, 1962)
Stictea mygindiana ([Denis &, Schiffermüller], 1775)
Strepsicrates coriariae Oku, 1974
Strophedra nitidana (Fabricius, 1794)
Strophedra quercivora (Meyrick, 1920)
Strophedra weirana (Douglas, 1850)
Syndemis musculana (Hübner, [1799])
Syricoris doubledayana Barrett, 1872
Syricoris hemiplaca (Meyrick, 1922)
Syricoris lacunana ([Denis & Schiffermüller], 1775)
Syricoris moderata (Falkovitsh, 1962)
Syricoris mori (Matsumura, 1900)
Syricoris paleana (Caradja, 1916)
Syricoris pryerana (Walsingham, 1900)
Syricoris rivulana (Scopoli, 1763)
Syricoris siderana (Treitschke, 1835)
Syricoris symmathetes (Caradja, 1916)
Syricoris tiedemanniana (Zeller, 1845)
Terricula violetana (Kawabe, 1964)
Tetramoera flammeata (Kumetzov, 1971)
Thaumatographa decoris (Diakonoff & Arita, 1976)
Thiodia citrana (Hübner, [1799])
Thiodia dahurica (Falkovitsh, 1965)
Thiodia irinae Budashkin, 1990
Thiodia lerneana Treitschke, 1835
Thiodia placidana (Staudinger, 1871)
Thiodia sulphurana (Christoph, 1888)
Thiodia torridana (Lederer, 1859)
Thiodia trochilana (Frolich, 1828)
Tia enervana (Erschoff, 1877)
Tortricodes alternella ([Denis & Schiffermüller], 1775)
Tortrix sinapina (Butler, 1879)
Tortrix viridana Linnaeus, 1758
Tosirips perpulchranus (Kennel, 1901)
Ukamenia sapporensis (Matsumura, 1931)
Xerocnephasia rigana (Sodoffsky, 1829)
Zeiraphera argutana (Christoph, 1881)
Zeiraphera atra Falkovitsh, 1965
Zeiraphera bicolora Kawabe, 1976
Zeiraphera corpulentana (Kennel, 1901)
Zeiraphera demutata (Walsingham, 1900)
Zeiraphera fulvomixtana Kawabe, 1974
Zeiraphera funesta Filipjev, 1930
Zeiraphera griseana (Hübner, [1799])
Zeiraphera isertana (Fabricius, 1794)
Zeiraphera ratzeburgiana (Saxesen, 1840)
Zeiraphera rufimitrana (Herrich-Schäffer, 1851)
Zeiraphera subcorticana (Snellen, 1883)
Zeiraphera virinea Falkovitsh, 1965

References 

Moths